Schizophrenia is the second studio album by Brazilian thrash metal band Sepultura, released on October 30, 1987 by Cogumelo Records. It is the first album for the band with Andreas Kisser. The album's sound leans more towards the death/thrash metal genre than the previous album Morbid Visions, which is stylistically closer to black metal. All songs were recorded during August 1987, except for the bonus track "Troops of Doom" which was recorded during August 26–27, 1990.

In America the band sent radio playlists at the time when they were struggling to book gigs because club owners were afraid to book them due to their style.  Roadrunner Records signed them and released Schizophrenia internationally before seeing the band perform in person.

Musical style

Kisser states that, when he joined Sepultura in '87, he

Track listing

Personnel
Sepultura
Max Cavalera – vocals, rhythm guitar, bass
Igor Cavalera – drums, percussion
Andreas Kisser – lead guitar, bass (uncredited)
Paulo Jr. – bass (credited, but did not perform)

Additional personnel
Henrique Portugal – synthesizers
Paulo Gordo – violins

Technical personnel
Tarso Senra – engineer
Gauguim – engineer on track 10
Scott Burns – mixing on track 10
Fabiana – photography
Jeff Daniels – producer (reissue)
George Marino – remastering (reissue)
Don Kaye – liner notes (reissue)

Charts

References

Further reading
 Shapiro, Marc (1993). Andreas Kisser Plays it Weird. Guitar presents Speed Demons of Metal, 12–14, 27.

1987 albums
Roadrunner Records albums
Sepultura albums
Death metal albums by Brazilian artists